Southern Ute is a census-designated place (CDP) on the Southern Ute Indian Reservation in southern La Plata County, Colorado, United States. The CDP is a part of the Durango, CO Micropolitan Statistical Area. The population of the Southern Ute CDP was 177 at the United States Census 2010. The Ignacio post office (Zip Code 81137) serves the area.

Etymology
Southern Ute is named for the Southern Ute people and the Southern Ute Indian Reservation.

Geography

Demographics

See also

 List of census-designated places in Colorado

References

External links

 Southern Ute Indian Tribe website
 La Plata County website

Census-designated places in La Plata County, Colorado
Census-designated places in Colorado